World News Now is an American overnight news broadcast seen on ABC.

WNN may also refer to:

Wnn, a Japanese text input system
Wennington railway station, Wennington, Lancashire, UK
Winnemucca (Amtrak station), Nevada, US
World Nuclear News, the news service of the World Nuclear Association
Wunnumin Lake Airport, Ontario, Canada